Cristopher Tronco Sánchez (born November 17, 1985 in Mexico City) is a Mexican swimmer.

He represented Mexico at the 2007 Pan American Games and the 2008 Summer Paralympics, as well as London 2012 and Rio 2016, where he made it to a final

References

External links
Swimming Day 1 Preview: Du Toit ready to open Paralympics with a gold.
Suma México 15 medallas más.
Irá México con 12 nadadores al Mundial de Natación en Holanda.
Obtiene 14 medallas de oro selección paralímpica de natación.

1985 births
Living people
Paralympic swimmers of Mexico
Mexican male backstroke swimmers
Mexican male breaststroke swimmers
Mexican male freestyle swimmers
Mexican male medley swimmers
Swimmers from Mexico City
Swimmers at the 2004 Summer Paralympics
Swimmers at the 2008 Summer Paralympics
Swimmers at the 2012 Summer Paralympics
Swimmers at the 2016 Summer Paralympics
Medalists at the 2007 Parapan American Games
Medalists at the 2011 Parapan American Games
Medalists at the 2015 Parapan American Games
Medalists at the 2019 Parapan American Games
Medalists at the World Para Swimming Championships
Swimmers at the 2020 Summer Paralympics
S3-classified Paralympic swimmers